
Gmina Cisna is a rural gmina (administrative district) in Lesko County, Subcarpathian Voivodeship, in south-eastern Poland, on the Slovak border.

The gmina contains part of the protected area called Cisna-Wetlina Landscape Park.

Villages
Gmina Cisna contains the villages and settlements of Buk, Cisna, Dołżyca, Habkowce, Kalnica, Krzywe, Liszna, Łuh, Majdan, Moczarne, Przysłup, Roztoki Górne, Smerek, Solinka, Strzebowiska, Wetlina, Zawój and Żubracze.

Neighbouring gminas
Gmina Cisna is bordered by the gminas of Baligród, Czarna, Komańcza, Lutowiska and Solina. It also borders Slovakia.

References
Polish official population figures 2006

Cisna
Lesko County